Philip Ι of Montfort (died 17 March 1270, Tyre) was Lord of La Ferté-Alais and Castres-en-Albigeois 1228–1270, Lord of Tyre 1246–1270, and Lord of Toron aft. 1240–1270. He was the son of Guy of Montfort and Helvis of Ibelin (daughter of Balian of Ibelin).

Life
At his father's death at the siege of Varilhes in the Albigensian Crusade in 1228, he succeeded to his French seigneuries. His first wife was Eleonore de Courtenay (d. bef. 1230), daughter of Peter II of Courtenay. Philip joined the party of his uncle, John of Ibelin, against the representatives of Frederick II. In 1244, he was created Constable of Jerusalem, but was subordinate to Walter IV of Brienne at the Battle of La Forbie. Philip was one of the few Christian knights to escape the disaster there. In 1246, Henry I of Cyprus, then Regent of Jerusalem, created him Lord of Tyre as a reward for his services to the baronial party. While the legality of this grant was somewhat dubious, it was recognized by Hugh I c. 1269; but Hugh reserved the right to buy back the fief.

Philip was married a second time, after 1240, to Maria of Antioch-Armenia, the elder daughter of Raymond-Roupen of Antioch and hence Lady of Toron and pretender of Armenia.

He joined the Seventh Crusade, and was employed as the ambassador of Louis IX of France in negotiations for a truce and retreat from Damietta. In 1256, he expelled the Venetians from Tyre, an action which helped to precipitate the War of St. Sabas. During that conflict, he attempted to relieve the Genoese in Acre in 1258, but was repulsed, which helped decide the struggle for the Venetians. In 1266, he lost Toron to the Sultan Baibars; but even in Philip's old age, Baibars feared both his energetic leadership and the possible success of his appeals to Europe for aid. In 1270, Philip was killed by an Assassin possibly in the employ of Baibars.

He was succeeded by his son Philip II in his French possessions, and by his son John of Montfort in Outremer.

Children
From his first marriage to Eleonore de Courtenay:
 Philip ΙΙ of Montfort, Lord of Castres-en-Albigeois (d. September 24, 1270, Tunis), married Jeanne de Levis-Mirepoix

From his second marriage to Maria of Antioch-Armenia:
 John of Montfort, Lord of Toron and Tyre (c. 1240 – November 27, 1283, Tyre), married September 22, 1268 Margaret of Antioch-Lusignan
 Philippa de Montfort (d. 1282), married William, Lord of Esneval in Normandy
 Humphrey of Montfort, Lord of Toron and Tyre (d. February 12, 1284, Tyre), married c. 1270s Eschiva of Ibelin, Lady of Beirut

References

Sources

Year of birth missing
1270 deaths
Christians of the Barons' Crusade
Christians of the Sixth Crusade
Christians of the Seventh Crusade
Philip
Philip
Assassinated royalty
Philip
People of the War of Saint Sabas
Victims of the Order of Assassins